Jazz-funk is a subgenre of jazz music characterized by a strong back beat (groove), electrified sounds, and an early prevalence of analog synthesizers.  The integration of funk, soul, and R&B music and styles into jazz resulted in the creation of a genre whose spectrum is quite wide and ranges from strong jazz improvisation to soul, funk or disco with jazz arrangements, jazz riffs, jazz solos, and sometimes soul vocals.

Jazz-funk is primarily an American genre, where it was popular throughout the 1970s and the early 1980s, but it also achieved noted appeal on the club-circuit in England during the mid-1970s. Similar genres include soul jazz and jazz fusion, but neither entirely overlap with jazz-funk. Jazz-funk is more arranged and features more improvisation than soul jazz, and retains a stronger feel of groove and R&B versus some of the jazz fusion production.

Overview

An extension of the jazz field, jazz-funk exhibits several distinctive characteristics.

A first is the departure from ternary rhythm (near-triplet), i.e. the "swing" (see swing rhythm), to the more danceable and unfamiliar binary rhythm, known as the "groove". Jazz funk was influenced by pure funk, a genre that created this groovy rhythm, which was played by James Brown's funky drummers Clyde Stubblefield and John "Jabo" Starks.

A second characteristic of jazz-funk music was the use of electric instruments, such as the Rhodes Piano or the electric bass guitar, particularly in jazz fusion (or electro-jazz), and the first use of analogue electronic instruments notably by Herbie Hancock, whose jazz-funk period saw him surrounded on stage or in the studio by several Moog synthesizers.  He used Hohner D6 Clavinet and others. Herbie Hancock was dedicated to jazz-funk on albums like Head Hunters (1973).  In the early 1980s, he threw electronic influences into the jazz-funk mix when he created Future Shock (1983).

A third feature is the shift of proportions between composition and improvisation.  Arrangements, melody, and overall writing were heavily emphasized. In a nutshell this is a departure from funky jazz and free jazz back to the street funk movement of the era. Examples of early jazz funk albums were Miles Davis' On the Corner (1972) and Jimmy Smith's Root Down (1972). The Last Poets, Gil Scott-Heron, Lightnin' Rod, T.S. Monk and Michael Henderson also released jazz funk albums.

Jazz-funk dance is directly related to the genre, with Jennifer Lopez popularizing it in the sketch comedy television series In Living Color.

Development
At its conception, the jazz-funk genre was occasionally looked down upon by jazz hard-liners as a sell-out, or "jazz for the dance halls".  It was insubstantially presumed by these to be not intellectual or elite enough, which led to controversy about the music crossing over, but it was making jazz much more popular and mainstream.

From a pop audience perspective, the ambivalence towards the jazz-funk genre arose – despite commercial success – because it was "too jazzy" and therefore too complex. Arrangements and instrumental tracks in pop or R&B music requires less initiation and allows the lead singer to relate to the audience, but jazz-funk was more focused on specific notes and overall music writing, so it seldom offered this same interaction with the audience.

In the UK's nightclubs of the mid to late 1970s, DJs like Colin Curtis in Manchester, Birmingham's Graham Warr and Shaun Williams, and Leeds-based Ian Dewhirst and Paul Schofield championed the genre, along with Chris Hill and Bob Jones in the South.

In the mid to late 1970s, London-based Soul and Funk pioneers drew a new audience to the genre: notably the pirate station Radio Invicta 92.4 with presenters Steve Chandler and Andy Jackson, along with pirate station JFM.
In the late 1980s, the work of rare groove crate diggers–DJs in England who were interested in looking back into the past and re-discovering old tunes, such as Norman Jay and Gilles Peterson, and hip hop DJs such as Marley Marl in the US, helped both the jazz community and the pop professionals to understand the value of the genre. Miles Davis, Donald Byrd and Herbie Hancock are seldom challenged as major influences on jazz. The Mizell Brothers have received official accolades from the industry and are being listened to widely. Their work has also been sampled in more modern music.

It is also worth noting that the more famous acid jazz movement is often seen as a rediscovery of 1970s jazz-funk, interpreted or produced by contemporary artists of the 1990s. One of the most blatant examples is the band US3, who were signed to Acid Jazz Records founded by Peterson and Eddie Piller.  US3 covered Cantaloupe Island, originally recorded by Herbie Hancock, and reissue of rare grooves from the era, led by DJ Peterson and Patrick Forge in the United Kingdom.

Role of producers
Many mainstream artists in jazz used the talents of a few producers who were specialists in the genre and generated great commercial success. The Mizell Brothers - Larry and Fonce - were responsible for a lot of the jazz-funk wave as they single-handedly produced many of the major jazz-funk artists (Johnny "Hammond" Smith, Gary Bartz, and more).

Other producers included Philly musician Dexter Wansel, generally acclaimed musicians (especially arrangers) themselves who tried their hand at sound-engineer, arranger, or composer. The Mizell Brothers produced most of Byrd's and Johnny "Hammond" Smith's jazz-funk.

UK jazz funk

While the vast majority of jazz-funk bands are American, several British jazz-funk artists and bands emerged in the late 1970s and early 1980s who broke away from the disco and commercial scene, encouraged by club DJs like Chris Hill, Robbie Vincent who was then on BBC Radio London, and Greg Edwards who had a Saturday evening show on London's first ever commercial radio station Capital Radio. This type of music was also heavily played on Europe's first soul radio station, Radio Invicta and later pirate radio stations such as Solar Radio, Horizon, and Kiss FM. The first of these self-contained bands to establish a real UK identity was Light of the World formed by Breeze McKrieth, Kenny Wellington, Jean-Paul 'Bluey' Maunick, Paul 'Tubbs' Williams, Peter Hinds and David Baptiste. Offshoots of the band also formed Beggar & Co and Incognito.

Jazz-funk in the 2010s
Some heavy producers (Jazzanova, Germany), some of whom are trained in classical music and jazz, are taking the elements of jazz-funk and using them in the full-electronic and computer assisted era. These movements are called nu jazz, and broken beat and are however heavily dominated not by instrumentalists, but rather by DJs.

See also

 Jazz fusion
 Soul jazz
 Acid jazz
 Broken beat
 Nu-jazz

References

External links
 
 Jazz funk (History in Britain)
 Blues & Soul Magazine Online
 Global Funk Radio

 
Funk genres
Jazz genres